Veprecula scala is a species of sea snail, a marine gastropod mollusk in the family Raphitomidae.

Description
The length of the shell attains 5.5 mm, its diameter 2 mm.

(Original description) The slender, fusiform shell is excavate at the base and below the suture. Its colour is burnt sienna, with a cream zone on the shoulder of the body whorl.

A tall and narrow protoconch contains four whorls, delicately radially ribbed. it is followed by five adult whorls. 

Sculpture: Spaced spiral cords over-run the ribs and form small scales on their summits, four on the penultimate,
then three and two on earlier whorls. On the body whorl they extend to the tip of the snout, and number about sixteen. The radial ribs are closely packed above, and are more spaced as they descend. On the body whorl they decrease to six in number, and are narrow, erect, and oblique. They vanish on the base. The siphonal canal is produced, and a little twisted. The anal sulcus is sutural, rather deep and narrow.

Distribution
This marine species is endemic to Australia and occurs off Queensland and the Gulf of Carpentaria.

References

 Powell, A.W.B. 1966. The molluscan families Speightiidae and Turridae, an evaluation of the valid taxa, both Recent and fossil, with list of characteristic species. Bulletin of the Auckland Institute and Museum. Auckland, New Zealand 5: 1–184, pls 1–23

External links
 Biolib.cz: image
 

scala
Gastropods described in 1922
Gastropods of Australia